Đorđe Golubović (born May 20, 1992) is a Serbian handball player who plays for AEK Athens.

References

External links
 EHF Profile

1992 births
Living people
Handball players from Belgrade
Serbian male handball players
CB Ademar León players